Jim McAndrew (born 30 December 1956) is a Canadian athlete. He competed in the men's long jump at the 1976 Summer Olympics.

References

1956 births
Living people
Athletes from Toronto
Athletes (track and field) at the 1976 Summer Olympics
Canadian male long jumpers
Olympic track and field athletes of Canada
Athletes (track and field) at the 1978 Commonwealth Games
Commonwealth Games competitors for Canada